Two Sisters is a 1929 American drama film directed by Scott Pembroke and featuring Boris Karloff. The film is one of the last produced in the sound-on-film process Phonofilm. The film is now considered to be lost.

Cast
 Viola Dana as Jean / Jane
 Rex Lease as Allan Rhodes
 Claire Du Brey as Rose
 Thomas G. Lingham as Jackson (credited as Tom Lingham)
 Irving Bacon as Chumley
 Thomas A. Curran as Judge Rhodes (credited as Tom Curran)
 Boris Karloff as Cecil
 Adeline Ashbury as Mrs. Rhodes

See also
 Boris Karloff filmography
 List of lost films

References

External links

1929 films
1929 drama films
American silent feature films
American black-and-white films
Silent American drama films
Films directed by Scott Pembroke
Lost American films
Rayart Pictures films
1929 lost films
Lost drama films
1920s American films